Indonesia Air Transport (IAT or sometimes called INDOSAT) is an airline and aviation company based in Jakarta, Indonesia. It provides a wide range of aviation services to both the on and offshore oil, gas and mining industries within Indonesia and South-east Asia. Its main base is Halim Perdanakusuma Airport, Jakarta. The company also maintain a secondary hub for its oil & gas industry clients in Sultan Aji Muhammad Sulaiman Airport, East Kalimantan, and operates limited scheduled services from Ngurah Rai International Airport on the island of Bali to the islands of Lombok and Flores.  Indonesia Air Transport is listed in category 1 by Indonesian Civil Aviation Authority for airline safety quality. The Company provides air passenger and cargo transportation, aircraft hiring and leasing services, aircraft repairs, and training facilities.  IAT also supplies aviation technical equipment and spare parts. It operates various types of fixed-wing aircraft and helicopters.

Other operations include tourism charter work, photo mapping and magnometer survey missions, executive jet services, medical and medevac operation support, air cargo requirements including operations from short or unimproved airstrips, maintenance facilities in Jakarta and Balikpapan and East Kalimantan. Indonesia Air Transport has certification from the Department of Transportation of Republic Indonesia and Eurocopter claims over 20,000 safe flight hours on helicopter SA365 Dauphin C2.

History 
The airline was established and started operations in 1968, initially for state oil company Pertamina and its foreign oil production sharing contractors. The airline is operated by PT Indonesia Air Transport Tbk and the company is currently listed on the Jakarta (JKT) Stock exchange.

PT Global Transport Services, a subsidiary of PT Bhakti Investama Tbk (MNC Media Group) and PT Global Mediacom Tbk, the southeast Asia's largest and most integrated media group, is owner of PT Indonesia Air Transport Tbk. In March 2007 the company had 246 employees. In 2010 the company was reported as having 232 employees.

Destinations 

In October 2008 IAT was offering scheduled services from Bali's Ngurah Rai International Airport DPS to Selaparang Airport AMI at Mataram on the island of Lombok; and to Labuan Bajo's Komodo Airport on the island of Flores. In September 2010 the DPS-AMI services were still being  operated with Fokker 50 aircraft. On 1 October 2011 all arriving and departing Lombok were relocated to the new Lombok International Airport.

Fleet

Current fleet
As of December 2021, the Indonesia Air Transport fleet includes the following aircraft:

Former fleet
The airline previously operated the following aircraft (as of August 2017):
 1 ATR 42-300QC
 1 Embraer Legacy 600

According to the Directorate General of Civil Aviation in September 2010 the  Indonesia Air Transport fleet consisted of 21 aircraft. As a total of 32 aircraft appear on charter availability lists possibly IAT are dry leasing some further aircraft such as the Short's, the Grumman Gulfstream I, and the Squirrels.

At August 2006 the airline also operated:
 BAC One-Eleven 400, 1 Aircraft
 BAC One-Eleven 475, 1 Aircraft

Expansion
In September 2012, the company has proposing to change its aviation business licence (Surat Izin Usaha Pererbangan) to Transportation Ministry for including medium class regular flight  with Husein Sastranegara International Airport, Bandung as the hub. Initial regular flight occurred on February 22, 2013 from Bandung to Medan.

References

External links 

 

Airlines of Indonesia
Airlines established in 1968
Airlines formerly banned in the European Union
Indonesian companies established in 1968